Yevgeni Valeryevich Ovshinov (born 17 October 1980) is a Kazakhstani-Russian former professional footballer.

References

External links
 

1980 births
Sportspeople from Stavropol
Living people
Russian footballers
Kazakhstani footballers
Kazakhstan under-21 international footballers
Association football defenders
FC Elista players
FC Irtysh Pavlodar players
Russian Premier League players
Russian First League players
Russian Second League players
Kazakhstan Premier League players
Kazakhstan First Division players